Originally a hall of residence at the University of Birmingham, University House became the home for the university's business school in 2004 after having been extensively refurbished and extended to provide teaching and research facilities. It is located in grounds in the conservation area of Edgbaston, Birmingham.

The name 'University House' was originally given to a building on Hagley Road in 1908. The present building was constructed in 1912 as a residence for female students at the university. In 1964, the hall became one of the UK's first mixed-sex university residences. It remained so until its closure as a residence in July 2002.

External links
University House page on the Birmingham Business School website
Birmingham Business School

University of Birmingham
Grade II listed buildings in Birmingham